Iowa's 3rd congressional district is a congressional district in the U.S. state of Iowa that covers its southwestern quadrant, which roughly consists of an area stretching from Des Moines to the borders with Nebraska and Missouri.

From 2013 to 2022, the district covered the southwestern corner of the state, from the Des Moines metropolitan area on the northeastern end to the greater Council Bluffs area on the southwestern end.

The district has been represented in the United States House of Representatives by Republican Zach Nunn since 2023.

Statewide races since 2000
Election results from statewide races:

List of members representing the district

Recent election results

2002

2004

2006

2008

2010

2012

2014

2016

2018

2020

2022

Historical district boundaries

See also

Iowa's congressional districts
List of United States congressional districts
Redistricting in the United States

References
General

Specific

 Congressional Biographical Directory of the United States 1774–present

03